John Adriano Acea (September 11, 1917 – July 25, 1963) was an American jazz pianist. He was born in Philadelphia to Adriano Acea of Cuba and Leona Acea of Virginia. One of six children, he was expected to die during his first decade of life from rheumatic fever, as did his youngest sister, Anna.

Session musician collaborations 
During the 1930s, Acea started out as a trumpeter and saxophonist. After his military service (US Army) in 1946, he switched to playing the piano. He later became a session musician with jazz veterans, including:

Eddie Lockjaw Davis
Cootie Williams
Dizzy Gillespie
Illinois Jacquet
Dinah Washington
James Moody
Zoot Sims
Roy Haynes

Compositions 
Acea is listed as co-composer on "Nice 'N' Greasy" – the closing track to Lou Donaldson's 1962 album, The Natural Soul. He is also credited as a composer on recordings by Gillespie, Jacquet and Moody.

Discography

As sideman
With Grant Green
The Latin Bit (Blue Note, 1962)
With Dodo Greene
My Hour of Need (Blue Note, 1962)
With Roy Haynes
Busman's Holiday (EmArcy, 1954)
With Illinois Jacquet
Groovin' with Jacquet (Clef, 1951-53 [1956])
The Kid and the Brute (Clef, 1955) with Ben Webster
With Joe Newman
Locking Horns (Rama, 1957) with and Zoot Sims
The Happy Cats (Coral, 1957)
With Leo Parker
Rollin' with Leo (Blue Note, 1961)
With Jesse Powell
It's Party Time (Tru-Sound, 1962)
With Don Wilkerson
Elder Don (Blue Note, 1962)

External links

American jazz pianists
American male pianists
Musicians from Philadelphia
1917 births
1963 deaths
20th-century American pianists
Jazz musicians from Pennsylvania
20th-century American male musicians
American male jazz musicians
United States Army personnel of World War II